The Roman Catholic Diocese of Mbanza Congo is a diocese located in the city of M'Banza Congo in the Ecclesiastical province of Luanda in Angola.

History
 7 November 1984: Established as Diocese of Mbanza Congo from the Diocese of Uíje

Special churches
The Cathedral of the diocese is Sé Catedral de Nossa Senhora da Conceição (Cathedral Church of the Conception of Our Lady) in M'Banza Congo.

Leadership
 Bishops of Mbanza Congo (Roman rite), in reverse chronological order
 Bishop Vicente Carlos Kiaziku, O.F.M. Cap. (5 January 2009–present)
 Bishop Serafim Shyngo-Ya-Hombo, O.F.M. Cap. (29 May 1992  – 5 January 2009)
 Bishop Afonso Nteka, O.F.M. Cap. (8 November 1984  – 10 August 1991)

See also
Roman Catholicism in Angola

Sources
 GCatholic.org

Roman Catholic dioceses in Angola
Christian organizations established in 1984
Roman Catholic dioceses and prelatures established in the 20th century
Mbanza Congo, Roman Catholic Diocese of
1984 establishments in Angola